Sigappu Rojakkal is a 1978 Indian Tamil-language psychological thriller film co-written and directed by Bharathirajaa. The film starring Kamal Haasan and Sridevi, with Goundamani, Bhagyaraj and Vadivukkarasi in supporting roles. It revolves around Dileep, who is traumatised by women's behaviour in his childhood, and grows up to be a psychopath who kills women after having sex with them.

Sigappu Rojakkal was inspired by serial killer Raman Raghav's crimes, and another serial killer who was based in Bombay but hailed from Tirunelveli. It was deliberately meant to be different from Bharathiraja's earlier ventures which were set in villages. The dialogues were written by Bhagyaraj, cinematography was handled by P. S. Nivas, and the music was composed by Ilaiyaraaja. Kamal plays an anti-hero in this film.

Sigappu Rojakkal was released on 28 October 1978, three days before Diwali, and completed a 175-day in most of the theatres in Tamil Nadu. It won two Filmfare Awards in the Best Actor and Best Director categories. The film was later remade by Bharathiraja himself in Hindi as Red Rose (1980).

Plot 
Dileep is an industrialist who runs a company named Minerva Exports & Imports. Despite his humble exterior, he has a dark side; he preys on nubile girls, has sex with them, and kills them. These proceedings are filmed and watched by his adoptive father and mentor, another deranged woman-hater who, as with Dileep, had a disillusioning experience with women in his past. The man stays holed up in a far corner of Dileep's mansion watching his adopted son carry out what he is too infirm to do. The victims are buried in Dileep's garden and a rosebush grows above them.

Dileep meets a garment saleswoman, Sarada, and develops a romantic attraction for her. Conservative Sarada insists that Dileep must marry her if he wants to have his way with her. The romance proceeds and culminates into marriage. On their first night after marriage, Dileep rushes away to tackle a witness who had seen him taking Chitra, an employee of Minerva, to a restaurant; Chitra was subsequently killed by Dileep. After offering the witness, a waiter at the restaurant, some money, the waiter counters with a demand for more money to remain silent. Dileep kills him while Donna Summer's "I Feel Love" plays on the soundtrack.

Meanwhile, Sarada, who has been waiting for Dileep, notices several odd situations at home. Dileep's cat licks Sarada's blood after she inadvertently cuts her finger. The cat chases her and she ends up in a secret room where the entire story of Dileep is written on a wall by him. Via a flashback we see scenes of Dileep's early life as an orphan who is taken in by a caring family. The daughter of the family begins to get feelings for Dileep after seeing water glistening on his bear legs.  She tries to seduce him but her parents come in at an opportune moment.  The daughter accuses Dileep of attacking her, causing the parents to kick him out of the house.  He ends up with another couple four days later and becomes their guest.  When his adoptive father leaves on a business trip, his adoptive mother drunkenly brings home another man.  Dileep's father kills his wife (in a bloodless scene) and Dileep has a mental breakdown, saying that all women should be killed.  This only endears Dileep to his new father. 

We rejoin the narrative where a frightened, Sarada rushes out and stumbles into the room of Dileep's adoptive father (who Dileep had told her was mentally ill and not to be disturbed) and gets shocked seeing him watching films of Dileep having sex with girls and killing them. Sarada screams, catching his attention but manages to lock him in his room. She tries to escape, but Dileep returns.

When Dileep goes to park his car, Sarada rushes out of the house. After freeing his adoptive father and realising that his cover has been blown, Dileep chases Sarada. The chase culminates in a graveyard where Dileep accidentally gets impaled by a cross but survives. When he continues to chase Sarada while staggering, he is caught by the police. Dileep is imprisoned but becomes mentally imbalanced. He keeps chanting and writing Sarada's name on the wall as it is the only coherent thought that remains; all other memories have been erased from his mind. Sarada, instead of remarrying, regularly visits Dileep in jail, confident that her marriage will be saved and Dileep will be released soon.

Cast 
 Kamal Haasan as Muthu (Dileep)
 Sridevi as Sarada
 Goundamani as the manager of Minerva Exports & Imports
 Bhagyaraj as the waiter
 Vadivukkarasi as Chitra
Poornima Jayaram as Sheela

Production

Development 
After directing two films – 16 Vayathinile (1977) and Kizhakke Pogum Rail (1978) – which were set in villages, Bharathirajaa chose to set his third film, the thriller Sigappu Rojakkal in the city to circumvent criticism that he could only make village-based films. The film was inspired by serial killer Raman Raghav's crimes, and another serial killer who was based in Bombay but hailed from Tirunelveli. It was produced by J. Padmavathi under K. R. G. Productions. K. Bhagyaraj worked as an assistant director.

Casting 
Bharathirajaa wanted actor Sivakumar to act in the lead role of Muthu / Dileep, over his assistant directors' objections. But after he narrated the story, Sivakumar rejected the offer, feeling it was not suitable for him despite liking the story. Kamal Haasan was eventually cast. He claims to have known the story of the film six years before shooting began. For his character's looks, Haasan wore "fitted suits with button-up shirts, ties" and flared bell-bottoms, in addition to "bright printed button-up shirts with enlarged collars and leather jackets". Haasan's looks in the film were inspired by the American serial killers Ted Bundy and Albert DeSalvo, while his "black leather jacket" was inspired by the one worn by Alan Arkin in Wait Until Dark (1967). Sridevi was cast as Sarada, collaborating with Bharathirajaa for the second time after 16 Vayathinile. Bharathirajaa initially cast Goundamani as a waiter and Bhagyaraj as the manager of Dileep's export company, but the actors later switched their roles. This was the feature film debut of Vadivukkarasi, who played Chitra. Bharathirajaa got a cat from his friend R. C. Prakash to portray Dileep's cat.

Filming 
Haasan had told Bharathirajaa that his character, a psychopathic killer, should not be singing and dancing but Bharathiraja deflected Haasan's objection, saying that the song "Ninaivo Oru Paravai" was a dream sequence, shot from the heroine's point of view. One of the shooting locations was a bungalow called Kamakoti House in T. Nagar. Filming was completed within 30 days.

Soundtrack 
The music was composed by Ilaiyaraaja. When Haasan was singing an English song at a concert, Ilaiyaraaja who witnessed this observed that he sang the higher notes well, and thus provided him to sing "Ninaivo Oru Paravai". A remixed version of the song was later included on M. Rafi's album Aasaiyae Alaipolae.

Release and reception 
Sigappu Rojakkal was released on 28 October 1978, three days before Diwali. In a review dated 19 November 1978, the Tamil magazine Ananda Vikatan rated the film 53 out of 100. Sivasankari, writing for Kalki, lauded virtually every aspect of the film including the direction, editing, camerawork, music and cast performances. Despite facing competition from other Diwali releases, it became a commercial success. It won two Filmfare Awards in the Best Actor and Best Director categories.

Remakes 
Sigappu Rojakkal was remade in Hindi by Bharathiraja himself as Red Rose (released in 1980).

In November 2009, Bharathiraja's son Manoj was announced to be making his directorial debut by remaking Sigappu Rojakkal. Manoj narrated his script to actors Ajith Kumar and then Dhanush in late 2009, both of whom were unable to do the film. After his stint as an assistant director in S. Shankar's Enthiran in early 2010, Manoj continued fine tuning the script and stated it was not a full remake and only drew inspiration from the original. He also revealed that director Ram had also helped on work with the script, while expressing interest in casting either actors Arya or Atharvaa to portray the lead character.

In October 2014, the film was confirmed to be on the verge of starting shoot with Manoj confirmed as director, while Bharathiraja announced that he would produce the venture. G. V. Prakash Kumar was signed on as the music composer, while Rajesh Yadav and Pazhanivel were picked as the project's cinematographer and editor. The film began production in Chennai during November 2014, with a publicity poster revealing that debutant actor Vishakan would portray the lead role. Bharathiraja revealed that he would play himself during the film's first half and stated that filming would take place in India and abroad in Switzerland. He also revealed that the film would not be a sequel, but would tell the story of a youngster who is affected to commit crimes after watching the original film. In January 2016, Manoj stated that work on the film had been postponed.

Legacy 
The success of Sigappu Rojakkal inspired more films in Tamil about psychopathic killers such as Moodu Pani (1980), Kaadhal Kondein (2003), Manmadhan (2004) and Nadunisi Naaygal (2011). Footage from Sigappu Rojakkal was also used in Yugam (2012). The line "Kuththunka esamaan Kuththunka, Intha Ponnunkale Ippadithaan Kuthunka" from the song "Ivaluka Imsai Thaanka Mudiyala" in Kalakalappu (2012) was named after the dialogue of the same name in Sigappu Rojakkal.

References

External links 
 

1970s crime thriller films
1970s psychological thriller films
1970s romantic thriller films
1970s serial killer films
1970s Tamil-language films
1978 films
Films directed by Bharathiraja
Films scored by Ilaiyaraaja
Indian crime thriller films
Tamil-language psychological thriller films
Indian romantic thriller films
Indian serial killer films
Tamil films remade in other languages